Isabella Discalzi Mazzoni (active late 15th century) was an Italian sculptor.

Career

Not much is known about Isabella’s early life. She was the second wife of sculptor Guido Mazzoni. Under her husband’s tutelage, she was taught the art of sculpting. It appears that she was known for her terracotta figures. She was so skilled that, according to biographer Lodovico Vedriani, they often appeared to come to life under her fingers. It is probable that she also worked in her husband’s bottega, most likely as part of the workshop at their house. Nineteenth-century author Stefano Ticozzi believed it was possible that she traveled both to Naples and to France, where her husband gained artistic commissions from Charles VIII.

Family

According to Lodovico Vedriani, Isabella and Guido were unable to have children. However, Guido apparently had a daughter from his first marriage, who was taught how to sculpt by Guido and Isabella. This unnamed daughter must have been very talented, for she caused Vedriani to claim that the Art of Sculpting won out over the Art of Painting. This daughter likely died young. The later painter Giulio Mazzoni was probably a relation.

Legacy

Vedriani claimed that Isabella should be “nominated, celebrated, and consecrated for eternity” as one of the great sculptresses of her day. Nothing remains from either Isabella’s or her step-daughter’s hands, and, as Ticozzi writes, not even “secure memories of those who came forth from their gentle hands” survive.

References

15th-century Italian sculptors
Italian women artists
Artists from Modena